Mandi House is a locality in Delhi, India. It was the former residence of the Raja of Mandi in Delhi.

History 
In the 1940s, the 18th Raja of Mandi State, Raja Sir Joginder Sen Bahadur built his residence next to what is now Himachal Bhawan. The estate was later sold and divided in the 1970s. The old palace was demolished to make way for large, modern offices which were constructed in the 1990s. The state house of Himachal Pradesh, Himachal Bhawan, is now located here. The headquarters Doordarshan Bhawan of the national television broadcaster Doordarshan is also located here. Today, the name of the office complex remembers the old royal residence as well the Mandi House metro station. The larger area around is also still referred to as Mandi House.

The Agrasen ki Baoli well is located near Mandi House.

References 

Royal residences in Delhi
Mandi, Himachal Pradesh
Doordarshan
Government buildings in Delhi